Bridgeford is an unincorporated community in Saskatchewan at the intersection of Highway 19 and Highway 367. It is south of Lake Diefenbaker, the Qu'Appelle River Dam and Douglas Provincial Park.

History
The community had a post office from 1909 to 1973. It was originally named West Bridgeford, after West Bridgford, Nottinghamshire, home town of early settlers. When the Canadian Pacific Railway built a station in the area, they shortened the name.

References

Former villages in Saskatchewan
Huron No. 223, Saskatchewan
Unincorporated communities in Saskatchewan